The Devil's Party is a 1938 American crime film directed by Ray McCarey based on the Borden Chase novel Hell's Kitchen Has a Pantry.

Plot
Marty Malone is a member of a street gang called the "Death Avenue Cowboys", consisting of poor children in Hell's Kitchen, New York. As the gang try to steal fruit from a fruit warehouse, Marty starts a fire to distract the watchmen, unfortunately it turns into a real blaze and he is caught by the police. Even though the police give him a rough time in questioning, he refuses to say the names of any other gang members, thus saving his friends and accomplices from capture. Marty is sent to a reformatory for delinquents.

Many years go by after that, and now Marty is the proud owner of the Cigarette Club, which is a cabaret and casino in Manhattan. In tending to his business, he sends men to strong-arm a customer reluctant to pay a gambling debt. The goons, Sam and Frank Diamond, beat the customer up, accidentally killing him. They try to make his death look as if a neon sign fell on him.

The police emergency squad investigating the death includes brothers Joe and Mike O'Mara, who graduated from Marty's childhood gang. Authorities dismiss the death as an accident, but Joe, eager to become a police detective, believes it was murder when he finds evidence that the support that gave way allowing the sign to fall was clearly cut rather than breaking with age.

That evening there is a reunion dinner at Marty's Cigarette Club, with the boyhood friends attending, including the O'Mara's. Jerry Donovan is now a priest, and Helen McCoy has become a performer at the club. Helen has spurned Marty's many proposals because she loves Mike O'Mara. Mike dances with Helen all evening.

Brother Joe, striking out with the ladies, exits the dinner, returns to the scene of the murder, impatient to solve the crime he believes was committed. Diamond and Sam, having realized he may expose them, corner him and push him off the roof to his death.

Later that evening, Marty arrives on the scene and is upset his incompetent thugs have perpetrated the murders. The homicide bureau dismisses Joe's case as an accident, but Mike is unconvinced, and believes Joe's death is connected to the previous one. He is also guilt stricken he didn't accompany his brother to investigate his hunch on the incident that brought his death.

Diamond and Sam rob a jewelry store, set off a bomb next to Marty's club, and send notes to Mike incriminating Marty. Mike takes the bait, loses control and tries to kill Marty, but Jerry stops him, and Mike is arrested. Marty refuses to press charges, and also confesses his involvement to Jerry. He explains to Jerry that he never intended any deaths to occur.

Diamond and Sam plan to rob the Polar Gardensa popular ice skating ring, and force Marty to participate through kidnapping Helen who wisely informs Jerry of where she is going. Diamond and Sam alert Mike of the plan who they hope will kill Marty. Mike again goes berserk, but Jerry again prevents Mike from killing Marty. In a shootout with the criminals, Marty dies taking a bullet intended for Mike. His death brings Mike and Helen together, and as Marty had requested, there is a playground built at Jerry's boys club in Marty's name.

Cast
 Victor McLaglen as Marty Malone
 William Gargan as Mike O'Mara
 Paul Kelly as Jerry Donovan
 Beatrice Roberts as Helen McCoy
 Frank Jenks as Sam
 John Gallaudet as Joe O'Mara
 Samuel S. Hinds as Judge Harrison
 Joe Downing as Frank Diamond
 Arthur Hoyt as Webster
 Jerry Tucker as Child (uncredited)

Opening
The film opens with the following: "Hell's Kitchen – a section of New York, where, not so many years ago, the children of the slums made their playground in that grim street ... DEATH AVENUE." A later intertitle reads: "An enduring friendship moves with the years to Hell's Kitchen's other boundary ... BROADWAY."

References

Sources

External links 
 
 

1938 films
1938 crime drama films
American black-and-white films
Universal Pictures films
American crime drama films
Hell's Kitchen, Manhattan
1930s English-language films
1930s American films